Šėta  is a small town in Kėdainiai District Municipality, Kaunas County, central Lithuania. In 2011, it had a population of 935.

References

This article was initially translated from the Lithuanian Wikipedia.
	

Towns in Lithuania
Towns in Kaunas County
Vilkomirsky Uyezd
Kėdainiai District Municipality